
Henning Schönfeld (19 May 1894 – 11 March 1958) was a general in the Wehrmacht of Nazi Germany during World War II who commanded the 2nd Panzer Division. He was a recipient of the Knight's Cross of the Iron Cross.

Awards and decorations

 Knight's Cross of the Iron Cross on 15 August 1940 as Oberstleutnant and commander of Aufklärungs-Abteilung 20

References

Citations

Bibliography

 

1894 births
1958 deaths
Major generals of the German Army (Wehrmacht)
German Army personnel of World War I
Recipients of the clasp to the Iron Cross, 1st class
Recipients of the Knight's Cross of the Iron Cross
German prisoners of war in World War II held by the United Kingdom
Military personnel from Szczecin
People from the Province of Pomerania
German Army generals of World War II